Paradyne Corporation, also referred to as AT&T Paradyne, was a maker of computer networking and telecommunications hardware, based in Largo, Florida. The company formed in 1969 to supply computer communications systems and expanded steadily through the 1970s and 80s. During these period they operated in the high-end modem market and competed with Motorola Codex, Racal-Milgo, and divisions of AT&T and IBM.

As one of its first major purchases after the 1982 Breakup of the Bell System, AT&T purchased the company for $250 million in 1989. The company grew to become a major supplier in the digital subscriber line (DSL) industry as that expanded. When AT&T spun off Lucent in 1996, Paradyne moved to the new company. Lucent quickly sold Paradyne to Texas Pacific Group (TPG Capital) for $175 million where it became Paradyne Networks.  The company changed hands several times since then and has been owned by DZS since 2005.

References

 
 
 
 

Telecommunications equipment vendors
Networking companies of the United States
American companies established in 1969
Former AT&T subsidiaries